Live at the Montreal Jazz Festival is the second DVD by Canadian jazz pianist and vocalist Diana Krall, released on 23 November 2004 via the Verve label. The album was recorded live on 29 June 2004 at Bell Centre, Montreal.

Track listing
 "Sometimes I Just Freak Out"
 "All or Nothing at All"
 "Stop This World"
 "The Girl in the Other Room"
 "Abandoned Masquarade"
 "I'm Coming Through"
 "Temptation"
 "East of the Sun (and West of the Moon)"
 "Devil May Care"
 "Black Crow"
 "Narrow Daylight"
 "Love me Like a Man"
 "Departure Bay"

References

External links

Diana Krall live albums
2004 live albums
Verve Records live albums